International Thriller Writers (ITW), was founded October 9, 2004, at Bouchercon XXXV, the "World Mystery and Suspense Conference", in Toronto, Ontario, Canada.  Six months later, some 150 authors with more than one billion books sold worldwide had joined the organization as founding members. As of October 5, 2014, the organization's website boasts more than 3,100 members in 28 countries.

History 
On October 9, 2004, at Bouchercon XXXV, the "World Mystery and Suspense Conference", in Toronto, Ontario, Canada, International Thriller Writers was founded. The organization was founded by Gayle Lynds and David Morrell and they became the organization's first co-presidents.

Notable members / alumni 

Its membership includes David Baldacci, Steve Berry, Dale Brown, Sandra Brown, Lisa Gardner, Brian Garfield, David Liss,  Lee Child, Lincoln Child, Clive Cussler, David Dun, Joseph Finder, Tess Gerritsen, Raelynn Hillhouse, Gregg Hurwitz, Faye Kellerman, Jonathan Kellerman, John Lescroart, Katherine Neville, Ridley Pearson, Kira Peikoff, Douglas Preston, M. J. Rose, R. L. Stine, M. Diane Vogt, and Stuart Woods, among others.

Events and awards
This is the first professional organization for thriller authors. The first thriller festival (ThrillerFest) for readers was held in June 2006 in Scottsdale, Arizona, at which the International Thriller Writers Awards for outstanding work in the field were announced.

Other events and programs include:
 Debut Authors Program
 Online Thriller School
 The Big Thrill online magazine
 Write2Thrill.org knowledge portal (upcoming)
 ITW Town Halls - video seminars
 Operation Thriller - USO tour

Publications

Thriller series
James Patterson edited the first anthology of all-original thriller short stories, titled Thriller: Stories to Keep You Up All Night, released in June 2006 by Mira.

Clive Cussler edited the second, titled  Thriller 2: Stories You Just Can't Put Down, released May 26, 2009 by Mira.

Sandra Brown edited the third, titled Thriller 3: Love Is Murder, released May 29, 2012 by Mira.

Watchlist series
 Originally broadcast weekly on Audible.com (25 September 2007 to 13 November 2007), as a 17-part serial. It is now available in other formats than audiobook.

 The sequel to The Chopin Manuscript.

See also 
 Conspiracy thriller
 Crime fiction
 Detective fiction
 Fiction
 Mystery fiction 
 Spy fiction
 Techno-thriller
 Thriller film
 Whodunit
 List of authors
 List of crime writers
 List of detective fiction authors
 List of mystery writers
 List of thriller authors

References

External links
 

Thriller writers
International professional associations
Organizations established in 2004